The 22897 / 98 Kandari Express is a Express  train belonging to Indian Railways South Eastern Railway zone that runs between  and  in India.

It operates as train number 22897 from Howrah Junction to Digha and as train number 22898 in the reverse direction, serving the states of  West Bengal.

Coaches
The 22897 / 98 Kandari Express has 1 AC chair car, 6 Chair car, seven general unreserved & two SLR (seating with luggage rake) coaches. It carries a pantry car.

As is customary with most train services in India, coach composition may be amended at the discretion of Indian Railways depending on demand.

Service

Routing
The 22897 / 98 Kandari Express runs from Howrah Junction via , Tamluk, Kanthi, Ramnagar to Digha.

Traction
As the route is electrified, a -based WAP-4 electric locomotive pulls the train to its destination.

References

External links
22897 Kandari Express at India Rail Info
22898 Kandari Express at India Rail Info

Rail transport in Howrah
Transport in Digha
Railway services introduced in 2009
Express trains in India
Rail transport in West Bengal
Named passenger trains of India